Dan Ettinger (born 1971) is an Israeli conductor, opera singer and pianist.

Biography
Ettinger is descended from Romanian immigrants to Israel, as his father and grandmother are Holocaust survivors.  He grew up in the Tel Aviv suburb of Holon.
Ettinger began taking piano lessons at the age of five. He received his musical training at the Thelma Yellin High School for the Arts in Givatayim.
Ettinger made a career as a baritone at the Israeli Opera in Tel Aviv, until he was offered a position as choir director. From 2002 to 2003, he was co-principal guest conductor of the Jerusalem Symphony Orchestra and conducted works such as Berlioz Symphonie fantastique, Mahler's 4th Symphony and Mozart's Requiem.

From 2003 to 2009, Ettinger was a conducting assistant to Daniel Barenboim and Kapellmeister at the Staatsoper Unter den Linden in Berlin.  He was Generalmusikdirektor of the Mannheim National Theatre from 2009 to 2016.

Ettinger has served as chief conductor of the Israel Symphony Orchestra Rishon LeZion and music director of the Israeli Opera in Tel Aviv, with an initial tenure in the posts from 2005 to 2014, and a second, current tenure beginning in 2018.  He became principal conductor of the Stuttgart Philharmonic Orchestra in 2015.  His current Stuttgart contract is through 2023. He made numerous opera guest performances from Covent Garden in London to the Vienna State Opera to the Metropolitan Opera in New York.  In June 2021, the Teatro di San Carlo announced the appointment of Ettinger as its next music director, effective 1 January 2023.

References

External links
 
 Hilbert Artists Management, German-language page on Dan Ettinger
 America-Israel Cultural Foundation page on Dan Ettinger
 Stuttgart Philharmonic German-language page on Dan Ettinger
 Tokyo Philharmonic Orchestra page on Dan Ettinger
 Royal Opera House page on Dan Ettinger

Living people
Israeli conductors (music)
Israeli people of Romanian-Jewish descent
21st-century conductors (music)
1971 births